Kauppinen is a village around  east of Kiruna in Kiruna Municipality, Norrbotten County, Sweden with 66 inhabitants in 2005. It lies close to the European route E10.

References 

Populated places in Kiruna Municipality
Lapland (Sweden)